is a former Japanese football player.

Playing career
Chiba was born in Sendai on May 3, 1983. After graduating from high school, he joined the J2 League club Albirex Niigata in 2002. On May 3, he debuted as a substitute midfielder against Sagan Tosu. He did not play in any other matches in 2002. In 2003, he moved to the Regional Leagues club Okinawa Kariyushi FC. In 2005, he moved to his local club Sony Sendai in the Japan Football League. He played as a regular player for three seasons. In 2008, he moved to the Regional Leagues club NEC Tokin. He retired at the end of the 2008 season.

Club statistics

References

External links

1983 births
Living people
Association football people from Miyagi Prefecture
Japanese footballers
J2 League players
Japan Football League players
Albirex Niigata players
Sony Sendai FC players
Association football midfielders